13 albums were number one on the Mega Album Top 100, the official albums record chart of the Netherlands, in 2010. The first album to top the chart that year was Susan Boyle's I Dreamed a Dream, and the last was Dromen durven delen by Marco Borsato. Artists and bands who had an album reach number one on the chart for at least one week were Boyle, K3, Jurk!, Caro Emerald, Jan Smit, Alain Clark, Ilse DeLange, Phil Collins, Nick & Simon, Jamiroquai, Bursato and Michael Jackson.  Out of all of them, Jurk!, Emerald and Jamiroquai had their first ever number-one album on the chart. Emerald's Deleted Scenes from the Cutting Room Floor was the best-performing of 2010, topped the 2010 year-end chart.

Chart history
Source:

References

See also
2011 in music

Number-one albums
Netherlands Albums
Lists of number-one albums in the Netherlands